Mochtherus is a genus of beetles in the family Carabidae, containing the following species:

 Mochtherus asemus Andrewes, 1924 
 Mochtherus kelantanensis Kirschenhofer, 1999 
 Mochtherus latithorax Jedlicka, 1935 
 Mochtherus longipennis Jedlicka, 1935 
 Mochtherus luctuosus Putzeys, 1875 
 Mochtherus magnus Andrewes, 1930 
 Mochtherus obscurus (Sloane, 1907) 
 Mochtherus sulawesiensis Kirschenhofer, 2010 
 Mochtherus tetraspilotus (W.S.Macleay, 1825) 
 Mochtherus uenoi (Habu, 1967)

References

External links
Mochtherus tetraspilotus, an Asian ground beetle on the UF / IFAS Featured Creatures website.

Lebiinae